This article is a list of notable unsolved problems in computer science. A problem in computer science is considered unsolved when no solution is known, or when experts in the field disagree about proposed solutions.

Computational complexity

 P versus NP problem
 What is the relationship between BQP and NP?
 NC = P problem
 NP = co-NP problem
 P = BPP problem
 P = PSPACE problem
 L = NL problem
 PH = PSPACE problem
 L = P problem
 L = RL problem
 Unique games conjecture
 Is the exponential time hypothesis true?
 Is the strong exponential time hypothesis (SETH) true?
 Do one-way functions exist?
 Is public-key cryptography possible?
 Log-rank conjecture

Polynomial versus nondeterministic-polynomial time for specific algorithmic problems

 Can integer factorization be done in polynomial time on a classical (non-quantum) computer?
 Can the discrete logarithm be computed in polynomial time on a classical (non-quantum) computer?
 Can the shortest vector of a lattice be computed in polynomial time on a classical or quantum computer?
 Can clustered planar drawings be found in polynomial time?
 Can the graph isomorphism problem be solved in polynomial time?
 Can leaf powers and -leaf powers be recognized in polynomial time?
 Can parity games be solved in polynomial time?
 Can the rotation distance between two binary trees be computed in polynomial time?
 Can graphs of bounded clique-width be recognized in polynomial time?
 Can one find a simple closed quasigeodesic on a convex polyhedron in polynomial time?
 Can a simultaneous embedding with fixed edges for two given graphs be found in polynomial time?

Other algorithmic problems
 The dynamic optimality conjecture: do splay trees have a bounded competitive ratio?
 Is there a -competitive online algorithm for the -server problem?
 Can a depth-first search tree be constructed in NC?
 Can the fast Fourier transform be computed in  time?
 What is the fastest algorithm for multiplication of two n-digit numbers?
 What is the lowest possible average-case time complexity of Shellsort with a deterministic, fixed gap sequence?
 Can 3SUM be solved in strongly sub-quadratic time, that is, in time  for some ?
 Can the edit distance between two strings of length  be computed in strongly sub-quadratic time?  (This is only possible if the strong exponential time hypothesis is false.)
 Can X + Y sorting be done in  time?
 What is the fastest algorithm for matrix multiplication?
 Can all-pairs shortest paths be computed in strongly sub-cubic time, that is, in time  for some ?
 Can the Schwartz–Zippel lemma for polynomial identity testing be derandomized?
 Does linear programming admit a strongly polynomial-time algorithm?  (This is problem #9 in Smale's list of problems.)
 How many queries are required for envy-free cake-cutting?
 What is the algorithmic complexity of the minimum spanning tree problem? Equivalently, what is the decision tree complexity of the MST problem? The optimal algorithm to compute MSTs is known, but it relies on decision trees, so its complexity is unknown.
 Gilbert–Pollack conjecture on the Steiner ratio of the Euclidean plane

Programming language theory

 POPLmark
 Barendregt–Geuvers–Klop conjecture

Other problems
 Aanderaa–Karp–Rosenberg conjecture
 Černý Conjecture
 Generalized star-height problem
 Separating words problem

References

External links
 Open problems around exact algorithms by Gerhard J. Woeginger, Discrete Applied Mathematics 156 (2008) 397–405.
 The RTA list of open problems – open problems in rewriting.
 The TLCA List of Open Problems – open problems in area typed lambda calculus.

Computer Science
Computer Science